SSL may refer to:

Entertainment
 RoboCup Small Size League, robotics football competition
 Sesame Street Live, a touring version of the children's television show
 StarCraft II StarLeague, a Korean league in the video game
 Supersonic Legend, a rank in Rocket League
 Shifting Sand Land, a level in Super Mario 64

Natural languages
 Samoan Sign Language
 Selangor Sign Language
 Somali Sign Language
 Spanish as a Second Language
 Spanish Sign Language
 Swedish Sign Language

Organizations
 Sisters of St. Louis, a congregation of Roman Catholic nuns
 SSL (company), formerly Space Systems/Loral, a satellite manufacturer

 Space Sciences Laboratory, in Berkeley, California, US
 Space Systems Laboratory (Maryland), at the University of Maryland, US (formerly at MIT)
 Space Systems Laboratory (MIT), at the Massachusetts Institute of Technology (separate from the SSL that moved to UMD)
 Space Systems Laboratory, at additional universities
 Solid State Logic, a manufacturer of audio mixing consoles
 Sainsbury’s Supermarkets Ltd, a British supermarket chain

Places
 South Salt Lake, Utah, a city in the US
 Social Science Library, Oxford, at the University of Oxford

Science and technology
 Sodium stearoyl lactylate, a food additive
 Standard sea level, physical conditions at sea level
 Sumatra squall lines, a weather phenomenon that affects the Malay Peninsula and Singapore

Computing and electronics

 Secure Sockets Layer, a standard security technology for establishing an encrypted link between a server and a client
 Solid-state lighting
 Semi-supervised learning, a class of machine learning techniques
 Single stuck line, a fault model for digital circuits
 Start-Stop Logic
 S/SL programming language

Sport
 Star Sailors League, a sailing league
 S.S. Lazio (Società Sportiva Lazio), an Italian football team
 South Shore League, an athletic conference in Massachusetts, US
 Swedish Super League (disambiguation), a floorball league in Sweden
 Sweden Super League, a rugby league competition in Sweden
 Saitama Seibu Lions, a baseball team in Japan

Other uses
 Sub-surface lines, cut-and cover railway lines forming part of London Underground